Ras Feeluk is a promontory in northeastern Somalia. It is located near the island of Socotra. It is close to Alloola, where the river Wady Afkaliya enters the sea.

See also 
 Ras Hafun
 SS Jeddah

References 

Gulf of Aden
Headlands of Somalia